A spectrum is a condition or value that is not limited to a specific set of values but can vary infinitely within a continuum.

Spectrum may also refer to:

Science and technology

Physics

 Continuous spectrum, of any physical quantity that can change smoothly
 Discrete spectrum 
 Electromagnetic spectrum
 Visible spectrum or optical spectrum, a subset of the electromagnetic spectrum
 Emission spectrum, observed in light
 Absorption spectrum, observed in light
 Radio spectrum, radio frequency subset of the electromagnetic spectrum
 Stellar spectrum, the combination of continuum, absorption, and emission lines produced by a star
 Energy spectrum, of a collection of particles (particle physics)
 Frequency spectrum, of a signal
 Power spectrum, of a signal

Medicine
 Spectrum disorder, a group of mental disorders of similar appearance or thought to share an underlying mechanism
 Autism spectrum, encompassing autism, Asperger's, etc.
 Antimicrobial spectrum, the range of microorganisms an antibiotic can kill or inhibit

Mathematics
In mathematics, spectrum frequently denotes a set of numbers associated to an object:
 Spectrum of a matrix, its set of eigenvalues, in linear algebra
 Spectrum (functional analysis), a generalization of the concept of matrix eigenvalues to operators
 Spectrum of a graph, studied in spectral graph theory
 Pseudospectrum
 Spectrum of a polygon, the set of numbers of possible equidissections
 Spectrum of a sentence, in mathematical logic
 Spectrum of a theory, in mathematical logic

There are also several other, unrelated meanings:
 Spectrum (topology), the fundamental object of study in stable homotopy theory
 Spectrum of a C*-algebra, a kind of dual object
 Spectrum of a ring, the set of its prime ideals, in commutative algebra

Arts and entertainment
 Spectrum (brand), a brand name used by Charter Communications for their telecommunication services, including:
 Spectrum News, a group of six cable news channels
 Spectrum Sports, a group of nine regional sports networks in the US
 Spectrum TV Stream, a streaming service

Publications
 IEEE Spectrum, a magazine by the Institute of Electrical and Electronics Engineers
 Spectrum (magazine), an independent Seventh-day Adventist magazine
 Spectrum (newspaper), a defunct Toledo, Ohio weekly newspaper
 Spectrum, a news website published by the Simons Foundation Autism Research Initiative
 The Spectrum (Utah), also known as The Spectrum & Daily News, a Gannett newspaper in St. George, Utah
 Spectrum (novel), a 2002 novel by Russian author Sergey Lukyanenko
 Spectrum, a magazine published with Scotland on Sunday
 Spectrum, a liftout in The Sydney Morning Herald

Student newspapers
 The Spectrum (USLS), the student newspaper of the University of St. La Salle in the Philippines
 The Spectrum (NDSU), the student newspaper of the North Dakota State University in the United States
 The Spectrum (University at Buffalo), the student newspaper of the State University of New York at Buffalo

Television
 Spectrum (TV channel), a defunct Chicago-area pay television broadcaster founded by United Cable
 Spectrum (TV series), a 1958 Canadian television series
 Spectrum (radio program), a daily broadcast series on CBS Radio, c. 1970–1992

Music
 Spectrum (band), an Australian group of the 1970s led by Mike Rudd
 Spectrum (group), a South Korean boy group formed in 2018 
 Spectrum, a British band lead by Peter Kember
 Spectrum, a bluegrass band that included Béla Fleck and Jimmy Gaudreau
 Spectrum (The Carpenters), 1960s jazz band led by Richard and Karen Carpenter
 Spectrum (Billy Cobham album), debut album of fusion drummer Billy Cobham
 Spectrum (Cedar Walton album), the second album by jazz pianist Cedar Walton
 Spectrum (Jega album), debut album of electronic musician Jega
 Spectrum (Steve Howe album), 2005
 Spectrum (Illinois Jacquet album), 1965
 Spectrum (Westlife album), 2019
 "Spectrum (Say My Name)", a 2012 song by British indie rock band Florence and the Machine
 "Spectrum" (Zedd song), a 2012 song by German electronic dance music producer Zedd; also covered by SM The Performance
 The Spectrum (Sirius XM), a music channel on Sirius Satellite Radio
 The Spectrum (1964–1970), a London-based pop group coincidentally providing the closing theme for the spectrum-themed TV show Captain Scarlet and the Mysterons
 The Spectrum (album), of 2017 by Daley
 Spectrum (Hiromi album), 2019

Other arts and entertainment
 Spectrum, a news website founded by the Simons Foundation Autism Research Initiative
 Monica Rambeau, a Marvel Comics character who uses the name Spectrum
 Spectrum, the worldwide security organisation in the 1960s TV series Captain Scarlet and the Mysterons
 Gaylactic Spectrum Awards or Spectrums, a literary award
 Spectrum Award, in fantasy, science fiction, and horror artwork

Buildings and structures
 Spectrum (Montreal), a defunct concert venue in Canada 
 Spectrum London, an art gallery in England
 Guildford Spectrum, a leisure complex in Guildford, England
 Smith Spectrum, a sports arena in Logan, Utah, US
 Spectrum (arena), a former arena in Philadelphia, Pennsylvania, US
 Northlands Spectrum, later known as Northlands Park, a horse racing track in Edmonton, Alberta, Canada

Organizations
 Spectrum Aircraft, a Canadian ultralight aircraft manufacturer
 Spectrum Aeronautical, a US-based manufacturer of very light jets
 Spectrum Animation, a defunct Japanese animation studio
 Spectrum Brands, an American home-essentials company
 Het Spectrum, a Dutch publishing company
 Spectrum Pharmaceuticals, an American biopharmaceutical company
 Spectrum (Amsterdam) (formerly Librije's Zusje), Michelin-starred restaurant in Amsterdam, The Netherlands

Products
 Spectrum (racing car), a series of Australian open wheel racing cars manufactured by Borland Racing Developments
 Chevy Spectrum, a North American car also sold as the Geo Spectrum
 ZX Spectrum, an early British home computer by Sinclair
 Spectrum, a brand of printer paper owned by Georgia-Pacific

Other uses
 Economic spectrum, disparities between social classes
 Political spectrum, of opinion
 Spectrum Range, a mountain range in British Columbia, Canada
 Spectrum (horse), a thoroughbred racehorse
 SPECTRUM Standard, a Museum Collections Management Standard developed by the Collections Trust

See also
 Spectral music
 Spector (disambiguation) or Spektor
 Spectre (disambiguation) or Specter
 Spectra (disambiguation)
 Spectral (disambiguation)
 Spektrum (disambiguation)